Brachyiulus pusillus is a species of millipede in the family Julidae. It is widespread in Europe and has also been introduced to islands around the world, continental South America, South Africa, and Oceania, and is potentially widespread in North America, although previous records may have confused B. pusilus with the related B. lusitanus. The species is brownish-black coloured and has 30–34 segments. They also have either light yellowish or reddish lines that are located closer to the centre of the back. It can be found on bushes and trees. The species are commonly found in walls or fences.

References

External links

Julida
Animals described in 1815
Millipedes of Europe